Renato De Carmine (25 January 1923 – 18 July 2010) was an Italian stage, film and television actor. After graduating at the Accademia Nazionale di Arte Drammatica Silvio D'Amico, De Carmine worked mainly on stage, notably at the Piccolo Teatro in Milan under the direction of Giorgio Strehler. He also appeared in more than seventy films and television series and TV-movies, including Lucio Fulci's The Return of White Fang (1974). He died of acute anemia.

Selected filmography
 Hand of Death (1949)
 William Tell (1949)
 Mistress of the Mountains (1950)
 Captain Demonio (1950)
 Milady and the Musketeers (1952)
 Charge of the Black Lancers (1962)
 Angelique and the Sultan (1968)
 Crimes of the Black Cat (1972)
 The Return of White Fang (1974)
 Allonsanfàn (1974)
 Devils of Monza (1987)
 Romanzo di un giovane povero (1995)

References

External links 
 

1923 births
2010 deaths
Italian male film actors
Italian male television actors
20th-century Italian male actors
Male actors from Rome
Accademia Nazionale di Arte Drammatica Silvio D'Amico alumni
Italian male stage actors